The Unconsoled is a novel by Kazuo Ishiguro, first published in 1995 by Faber and Faber, and winner of the Cheltenham Prize that year.

Plot introduction 
The novel takes place over a period of three days. It is about Ryder, a famous pianist who arrives in a central European city to perform a concert. He is entangled in a web of appointments and promises which he cannot seem to remember, struggling to fulfil his commitments before Thursday night's performance and frustrated with his inability to take control.

Characters

Ryder – Renowned concert pianist
Sophie – Gustav's daughter and Boris' mother
Boris – Sophie's son
Gustav – Bellhop of the hotel and Boris' grandfather
Miss Collins – Former lover of Brodsky
Hoffman – Manager of the hotel
Mrs Hoffman – Hoffman's wife; has photo albums dedicated to Ryder
Stephan – Hoffman's son. Also a pianist, yet is insecure about his parents' disapproval 
Brodsky – Washed up conductor the town tries to revive
Bruno – Brodsky's deceased dog
Fiona – Train ticketer, Ryder's childhood friend
Geoffrey Saunders – Another childhood friend of Ryder. Pops up sporadically throughout the town.
Miss Stratmann – in charge of planning Ryder's concert
Christoff – Musician disliked by the town

Reception 
The Unconsoled was described as a "sprawling, almost indecipherable 500-page work" that "left readers and reviewers baffled". It received strong negative reviews with a few positive ones. Literary critic James Wood said that the novel had "invented its own category of badness". However, a 2006 poll of various literary critics voted the novel as the third "best British, Irish, or Commonwealth novel from 1980 to 2005", tied with Anthony Burgess's Earthly Powers, Salman Rushdie's Midnight's Children, Ian McEwan's Atonement, and Penelope Fitzgerald's The Blue Flower. John Carey, book critic for the Sunday Times, also placed the novel on his list of the 20th century's 50 most enjoyable books. It has come to be generally regarded as one of Ishiguro’s best works.

References

External links 
 Random House profile
 Random House Reading Group Center
Confucianism in Kazuo Ishiguro's The Unconsoled

1995 British novels
Fiction with unreliable narrators
Novels by Kazuo Ishiguro
Novels about music
Faber and Faber books